The 1994 Argentina rugby union tour of South Africa was a series of eight matches played by the Argentina national rugby union team in September and October, in South Africa.  South Africa won both international matches.

Matches

The Team

Sources

 

Argentina national rugby union team tours
1994
tour
tour